The 2014 Ford EcoBoost 400 was a NASCAR Sprint Cup Series stock car race held on November 16, 2014, at Homestead-Miami Speedway in Homestead, Florida. Contested over 267 laps, it was the 36th and final race of the 2014 NASCAR Sprint Cup Series season, and the tenth and final race of the Chase for the Sprint Cup. This race marked the final NASCAR broadcast for ESPN, ending an eight-year stint covering the sport; as well as the final NASCAR broadcast for Allen Bestwick, who has covered the sport since 1986. Next season he will remain with ESPN and ABC calling IndyCar races. Kevin Harvick held off Ryan Newman to score the victory and score his first ever championship. Chevrolet clinched its twelfth consecutive manufacturers championship. Newman was second while Brad Keselowski, Paul Menard, and Jamie McMurray rounded out the top five. The top rookies of the race were Kyle Larson (13th), Justin Allgaier (15th), and Austin Dillon (25th).

Previous week's race
Kevin Harvick dominated the Quicken Loans Race for Heroes 500 to score the victory. "Wow. I guess that's what it feels like to hit a walkoff in extra innings. I mean this thing -- both races here -- has been bad to the bone," Harvick said after winning his fourth race at this 1-mile oval in the last five tries. Harvick would not have made the final four to race for the title without a win. I could tell that we were going to have to win because everybody was running in the front of the pack that we were racing against. I think this says a lot about our team. We had our backs against the wall. We're in victory lane and we get to go on."

Report

Background
Homestead-Miami Speedway is a motor racing track located in Homestead, Florida. The track, which has several configurations, has promoted several series of racing, including NASCAR, the IRL IndyCar Series, the Grand-Am Rolex Sports Car Series, and the Championship Cup Series. Since 2002, Homestead-Miami Speedway has hosted the final race of the season in all three of NASCAR's series: the Sprint Cup Series, Xfinity Series, and the Camping World Truck Series. Ford Motor Company sponsors all three of the season-ending races; the races have the names Ford EcoBoost 400, Ford EcoBoost 300, and Ford EcoBoost 200, respectively, and the weekend is marketed as Ford Championship Weekend. The Xfinity Series (then known as the Nationwide Series) has held its season-ending races at Homestead since 1995.

This was the final NASCAR race for driver Marcos Ambrose, who will be returning to V8 Supercars in his native Australia next season. It was also the final NASCAR race for crew chief Steve Letarte, who will be leaving Hendrick Motorsports, where he's worked at since he was 16, and moving to the broadcast booth for NBC Sports next season. After four decades of being a crew chief and winning races in four decades, Jimmy Fennig retired from the sport after the checked flag flew. “Racing is what makes him tick and the competition,’‘ Matt Kenseth said of Fennig. “It’s hard to argue that Jimmy isn’t one of the best crew chiefs in the garage. There’s not many people that have been in the sport as long as he has and remained relevant and competitive as long as he has. I’ll never forget when we won the Daytona 500 in 2012 and he was smiling and said, ‘The last time I was here was 25 years ago with Bobby Allison – that was the last time I won the Daytona 500.’ When you think about that and all the changes that this sport has had with technology and the cars and engineering and all that stuff compared to where we started, it really says something about somebody that’s still that competitive today.” “Jimmy somehow finds more time in the day and finds a way to work harder than almost anybody I’ve ever met," Carl Edwards said. "He cares as much or more about winning than anyone I’ve ever been around, so to me Jimmy has been a huge positive influence on me and my driving and he’s a friend.’’

Entry List
(R) denotes rookie driver
(CC) denotes championship contender

Practice and qualifying
I don't know that I've ever been on the pole here and to get the 200th for Hendrick is cool," said Gordon. I think the way we are looking at this weekend is we want to close out the season the absolute best we can. It has been a tremendous season. The No. 24 team has been incredible this year. We are disappointed that we aren't in this thing for the championship, but that's not going to stop us from trying to go out to win the pole and win the race." “This is going to be a race that you are going to go through some changing conditions,” said Kevin Harvick of the 400 miles that wait on Sunday. “Today was really about trying to get a solid starting spot. And we were able to do that with my Budweiser team. Just really proud of my guys. We had a really good day today. Just got to keep doing what we have to do and see where it all falls on Sunday." “A buddy of mine once said it isn't where you start, it is where you stop. We have got half of them beat to start, we'll keep digging with the Caterpillar Chevrolet. We just struggled there a little bit." Ryan Newman said of his qualifying effort. Brian Scott blew his engine early in the session and started from the rear since this change took place post-qualifying. Ryan Newman had to replace the front splitter after hitting a piece of debris.

Race

The race was scheduled to begin at 3:17 p.m. Eastern time, but the cars didn't begin rolling off pit road until 3:19 p.m. The race started eight minutes late at 3:25 p.m. with Jeff Gordon leading the field to the green. With 22 entries in the field, Chevrolet clinched their 38th manufacturers championship and twelfth consecutive. "Winning the Manufacturers' championship is one of the goals we set at the beginning of every season," Jim Campbell, U.S. Vice President, Performance Vehicles and Motorsports, said. "This championship is the result of great teamwork by the owners, drivers, crew chiefs, crews and technical partners. Special thanks to the Chevrolet powertrain team, along with the engine shops at Hendrick Motorsports and Earnhardt-Childress Racing for delivering the right combination of power, fuel economy, and reliability throughout the entire season. Congratulations to everyone who has made this special achievement possible for Chevrolet." The first caution of the race flew on lap eleven for a cable coming off the catch fence near the start/finish line. Blake Koch stayed out to lead a lap before pitting. Kurt Busch beat Gordon off pit road to assume the lead. The race restarted on lap 15. Kevin Harvick pushed Gordon to the lead and then slingshotted around him to take the lead himself. Jeff Gordon took the lead back on lap 26. The second caution of the race flew on lap 58 after Brett Moffitt had smoke billowing from his car. The race restarted on lap 64 and Denny Hamlin shot to the lead. Gordon took the lead back from Hamlin on lap 66. The third caution of the race flew on lap 86 after Brett Moffitt slammed the wall in turn 2. The race restarted on lap 91. The fourth caution of the race flew on lap 116 after Alex Bowman scraped the wall in turn 2. Kyle Busch was running fifth when he broke the rear-end axle when his car was dropped off the jack. The race restarted on lap 121. Gordon and Harvick swapped the lead back and forth the next three laps until Kevin muscled his way to the lead on lap 124. The fifth caution of the race flew on lap 155 after A. J. Allmendinger slapped the wall in turn 3. Jeff Gordon retook the lead after beating off Denny Hamlin and Kevin Harvick off pit road. The race restarted on lap 161. The sixth caution of the race flew on lap 162 after Greg Biffle slammed the wall in turn 3. The race restarted on lap 166 and Denny Hamlin retook the lead. Tony Stewart, who was running 28th a lap down, took his car to the garage with 82 laps to go. This ended his streak of 15 consecutive seasons of winning at least one race. The seventh caution of the race flew with 74 laps to go when Marcos Ambrose, making his final NASCAR start, slammed the wall in turn 3. The race restarted with 69 laps to go. The eighth caution of the race flew with 61 laps to go after Trevor Bayne, in his final race with the Wood Brothers, blew a tire on the backstretch. The race restarted with 55 laps to go and Denny Hamlin took back the lead. Debris on the backstretch brought out the ninth caution of the race with 47 laps to go. Jeff Gordon beat Hamlin off pit road to retake the lead. The race restarted with 42 laps to go. The tenth caution of the race flew with 32 laps to go after A. J. Allmendinger slammed the wall rear first in turn 1. The race restarted with 25 laps to go. Debris in turn 2 brought out the eleventh caution with 20 laps to go. The race restarted with 15 laps to go and Denny Hamlin took back the lead. With 13 laps to go, J. J. Yeley and Blake Koch wrecked hard in turn 3. That brought out the twelfth caution. The race restarted with nine laps to go. Kevin Harvick took the lead with eight laps to go. Debris in turn 1 brought out the 13th caution of the race with six laps to go. The race restarted with three laps to go and Kevin Harvick took both the victory and the championship. “I was just holding the pedal down and hoping for the best,’’ Harvick said. "This new format has been so stressful. I’m going to go sleep for a week."’ “We didn't have quite enough,” Newman said. “That's disappointing, but like I said, it was an awesome team effort, and I think, again, this is a great racetrack to have a race like this, and I thought there was some amazing passing, and we don't get that at every racetrack.” Jeff Gordon's tenth-place finish moved him past Mark Martin for the second-most top ten finishes in NASCAR history.

Post-race
During the race, NASCAR ordered Chad Knaus and members of Hendrick Motorsports to report to the NASCAR hauler after the race. Knaus will not face any penalties for putting in a wheel spacer. “It’s really not a big deal,’’ Robin Pemberton said. “We were trying to clarify what went on. I’m not going to get into the weeds on (the rule), but sometimes if you thought you had an issue with a wheel stud or something mechanical like that, you may need to put a spacer on to get some clean threads for the lug nuts. I have no idea (why they wanted it on), that’s not our question. It really is such a minute deal. It’s fine. Everything is good.’’

Results

Qualifying

Race results

Notes regarding points (See Championship Points for explanation):
nb - Driver and owner are not eligible for any of the three NASCAR bonus points (three for winning, one for leading a lap, one for leading the most laps) as they are a Championship Four driver and team.
op - Driver did not declare for Sprint Cup Series driver points.  Points listed are owner points only, used by NASCAR for bonus money programs and provisional starting positions.

Race statistics
 18 lead changes among different drivers
 13 cautions for 52 laps
 Time of race: 3:16:31
 Kevin Harvick won his fifth race in 2014

Final season standings

Drivers' Championship standings

Manufacturers' Championship standings

Note: Only the first sixteen positions are included for the driver standings.

Note

References

Ford EcoBoost 400
Ford EcoBoost 400
Ford EcoBoost 400
NASCAR races at Homestead-Miami Speedway